The enzyme 2-dehydro-3-deoxy-L-pentonate aldolase catalyzes the chemical reaction

2-dehydro-3-deoxy-L-pentonate  pyruvate + glycolaldehyde

This enzyme belongs to the family of lyases, specifically the aldehyde-lyases, which cleave carbon-carbon bonds.  The systematic name of this enzyme class is 2-dehydro-3-deoxy-L-pentonate glycolaldehyde-lyase (pyruvate-forming). Other names in common use include 2-keto-3-deoxy-L-pentonate aldolase, 2-keto-3-deoxy-L-arabonate aldolase, 2-keto-3-deoxy-D-xylonate aldolase, 3-deoxy-D-pentulosonic acid aldolase, and 2-dehydro-3-deoxy-L-pentonate glycolaldehyde-lyase.  This enzyme participates in fructose and mannose metabolism.

References

 

EC 4.1.2
Enzymes of unknown structure